The following are the national records in athletics in Micronesia maintained by Micronesia's national athletics federation: Federated States of Micronesia Athletic Association (FSMAA).

Outdoor

Key to tables: 

ht = hand timing

OT = oversized track (> 200m in circumference)

Men

Women

Indoor

Men

Women

References

External links
 FSMAA web site

Micronesia
Athletics
Records
Athletics